Dieudonné Mubenzem (born 22 March 1996) is a Czech handball player for TV Hüttenberg and the Czech national team.

He participated at the 2018 European Men's Handball Championship.

His father is from the Democratic Republic of the Congo, while his mother is Colombian. They met during their university studies in former Czechoslovakia.

References

External links

1996 births
Living people
Sportspeople from Prague
Czech male handball players
Expatriate handball players
Czech expatriate sportspeople in Germany
Czech people of Colombian descent
Czech people of Democratic Republic of the Congo descent